Jhaptal is a tala of Hindustani music. It presents quite a different rhythmical structure from Teental, unlike which it is not symmetrical. It is used in madhyalay (medium-tempo) Khyal.

Arrangement
Jhaptal is a 10-beat pattern used in raga exposition. It has ten beats in four divisions (vibhag), of 2-3-2-3, the third of which is the khali, or open division. To follow the tal the audience clap on the appropriate beat, which in jhaptal is beats 1, 3 and 8 (the first beat in each full division). A wave of the hand indicates beat 6, the first beat of the khali section. 

Series of Claps and Waves:
clap, 2, clap, 2, 3, wave, 2, clap, 2, 3

Theka
The split for Jhaptaal : 2+3+2+3 che 4. 
In Devanagari :  धी ना - धी धी ना  --  ती ना - धी धी ना . 
It has a characteristic pattern of bols (theka).  

Note the bols used for the first beat of each division: Dhi, is played at the beginning of the first, second and final divisions; for the khali section, Na - a right hand bol - is used to indicate that the division is open.

External links
 Site for hearing Jhaptal being played

Hindustani talas